Ambrak is a Torricelli language spoken in Nuku District of Sandaun Province in Papua New Guinea. According to the 2000 census, there are 290 speakers.

References

Palei languages
Languages of Sandaun Province